Baş Göynük (also, Baş Köynük and Bash Gëynyuk) is a village and municipality in the Shaki Rayon of Azerbaijan. It is the largest settlement of Sheki region. It has a population of 13260 (2009)

References 

Populated places in Shaki District